Vega del Guadalquivir is a comarca in the province of Seville.  It contains the following municipalities:
 
 Alcalá del Río
 Alcolea del Río
 Brenes
 Burguillos
 Cantillana
 La Algaba
 Lora del Río
 Tocina
 Villanueva del Río y Minas
 Villaverde del Río

References 

Comarcas of Andalusia
Province of Seville